Pseudoruegeria aestuarii is a Gram-negative, rod-shaped, aerobic and non-motile bacterium from the genus of Pseudoruegeria which has been isolated from tidal flat sediments from Muuido in Korea.

References

External links
Type strain of Pseudoruegeria aestuarii at BacDive -  the Bacterial Diversity Metadatabase

Rhodobacteraceae
Bacteria described in 2015